Sir John William Pratt (9 September 1873 – 27 October 1952), was a Scottish Liberal politician.

Pratt was Warden of Glasgow University Settlement, 1902–12 and was a Member of Glasgow Town Council, 1906. At the start of his political career he was a Fabian.

Pratt entered Parliament for Linlithgowshire in a 1913 by-election, a seat he held until 1918, and then represented Glasgow Cathcart until 1922. He served in the coalition government of David Lloyd George as a Junior Lord of the Treasury from 1916 to 1919 and as Parliamentary Secretary to the Ministry of Health for Scotland from 1919 to 1922. He was knighted in the 1922 Dissolution Honours.

Pratt did not contest the general election of the same year. At the 1923 General election he sought a return to parliament but narrowly failed to re-gain Dundee for the Liberals. He then contested the 1924 Glasgow Kelvingrove by-election without success. He did not contest the 1924 General Election. At the 1929 General Election, he stood for the Liberals at Sunderland without success. At the 1931 General Election, he stood for the New Party at Manchester Hulme, again without success.

Pratt died in October 1952, aged 79.

Electoral record

References

External links 
 

Pratt (Liberal politician), John
Pratt (Liberal politician), John
Members of the Parliament of the United Kingdom for Glasgow constituencies
Scottish Liberal Party MPs
UK MPs 1910–1918
UK MPs 1918–1922